Vantz Singletary (born November 23, 1965) is an American football coach, who is currently the Defensive Ends Coach at Tennessee State University. He previously served as the Co-Defensive Coordinator, Defensive Line Coach, and Pro Scout Liaison at Liberty University from 2012-2018. He was the inside linebacker coach for the San Francisco 49ers from 2009-2010. He has also coached at the University of Kansas, University at Buffalo, University of Tennessee at Chattanooga, University of Hawaii, Southern University and Trinity International University. In his college career, he has tutored more than a half dozen future NFL players. Singletary is the nephew of Pro Football Hall of Fame linebacker Mike Singletary.

Personal life
Singletary is married to the former Shawndra Saulter, and together they have four daughters.

References

1965 births
Living people
American football linebackers
Blinn Buccaneers football players
Buffalo Bulls football coaches
Chattanooga Mocs football coaches
Hawaii Rainbow Warriors football coaches
Kansas Jayhawks football coaches
Kansas State Wildcats football players
Liberty Flames football coaches
San Francisco 49ers coaches
Southern Jaguars football coaches
Trinity International Trojans football coaches
Players of American football from Houston